La Poile is a local service district and designated place in the Canadian province of Newfoundland and Labrador. It is on La Poile Bay. The community is inaccessible by road and is served by a ferry via a port in Rose Blanche.

The town mainly works in lobster fishing. As of the 2021 census the population is 61 people. The community has a school offering grades K-9 and a small store. There is an Anglican church which offers services once a month. Health care is limited to a first responder and a visiting doctor who comes once a month, weather permitting.

The town was the subject of an episode of Viceland's Abandoned. There is only 1 students in the local school. The last town-wide vote in 2017 did not have enough support for the residents to accept provincial money to leave the settlement under the resettlement program.

Geography 
La Poile is in Newfoundland within Subdivision I of Division No. 3.

Demographics 

Government 
La Poile is a local service district (LSD) that is governed by a committee responsible for the provision of certain services to the community. The chair of the LSD committee is Monford Organ.

See also 
List of designated places in Newfoundland and Labrador
List of local service districts in Newfoundland and Labrador
Newfoundland outport

References 

Designated places in Newfoundland and Labrador
Local service districts in Newfoundland and Labrador
Road-inaccessible communities of Newfoundland and Labrador
Car-free zones in Canada
Fishing communities in Canada
Populated coastal places in Canada